The 1993 Major League Baseball draft began with first round selections on June 3, 1993. Alex Rodriguez was selected first overall by the Seattle Mariners. Other notable draftees included Chris Carpenter, Torii Hunter, Jason Varitek, Scott Rolen, future NFL Hall of Famer Marshall Faulk, and Heisman Trophy winner Charlie Ward.

First round selections

Compensation picks

Compensation Picks

Other notable players

Scott Rolen, 2nd round, 46th overall by the Philadelphia Phillies
Chris Singleton, 2nd round, 48th overall by the San Francisco Giants
Jeff Suppan, 2nd round, 49th overall by the Boston Red Sox
Jay Witasick, 2nd round, 58th overall by the St. Louis Cardinals
Greg Norton, 2nd round, 59th overall by the Chicago White Sox
Brad Fullmer, 2nd round, 60th overall by the Montreal Expos
Scott Sullivan, 2nd round, 62nd overall by the Cincinnati Reds
Matt Clement, 3rd round, 86th overall by the San Diego Padres
Eli Marrero, 3rd round, 88th overall by the St. Louis Cardinals
Billy Koch, 4th round, 108th overall by the New York Mets, but did not sign
Paul Bako, 5th round, 148th overall by the Cincinnati Reds
Brian Moehler, 6th round, 165th overall by the Detroit Tigers
Scott Spiezio, 6th round, 181st overall by the Oakland Athletics
Mark Loretta, 7th round, 207th overall by the Milwaukee Brewers
John Thomson, 7th round, 212th overall by the Colorado Rockies
Steve Kline, 8th round, 223rd overall by the Cleveland Indians
R. A. Dickey, 10th round, 277th overall by the Detroit Tigers, but did not sign
Kevin Millwood, 11th round, 320th overall by the Atlanta Braves
Alex Cora, 12th round, 345th overall by the Minnesota Twins, but did not sign
Gary Matthews, Jr., 13th round, 366th overall by the San Diego Padres
Keith Foulke 14th round, 389th overall by the Detroit Tigers, but did not sign
José Molina 14th round, 390th overall by the Chicago Cubs
Bill Mueller, 15th round, 414th overall by the San Francisco Giants
Rodney Mazion, 15th round, 416th overall by the New York Mets
Mike Sirotka, 15th round, 425th overall by the Chicago White Sox
Tim Cossins, 16th round, 451st overall by the Texas Rangers
Glendon Rusch, 17th round, 469th overall by the Kansas City Royals
Dan Kolb, 17th round, 485th overall by the Minnesota Twins, but did not sign
Jermaine Dye, 17th round, 488th overall by the Atlanta Braves
John Rocker, 18th round, 516th overall by the Atlanta Braves
Mark Hendrickson, 21st round, 590th overall by the San Diego Padres, but did not sign
Richie Sexson, 24th round, 671st overall by the Cleveland Indians
Paul Lo Duca, 25th round, 690th overall by the Los Angeles Dodgers
Doug Davis, 31st round, 858th overall by the Los Angeles Dodgers, but did not sign
Jacque Jones, 31st round, 861st overall by the Kansas City Royals, but did not sign
Craig Dour, 32nd round, 897st overall by the New York Yankees, Military Veteran 
Dave Berg, 38th round, 1079th overall by the Florida Marlins
Bob Howry, 45th round, 1269th overall by the Florida Marlins, but did not sign
Dave Roberts, 47th round, 1303rd overall by the Cleveland Indians, but did not sign
Plácido Polanco, 49th round, 1357th overall by the Chicago White Sox, but did not sign
Mark Brownson, 30th round, 856th overall by the Colorado Rockies

NFL/NBA players drafted 
Akili Smith, 7th round, 206th overall by the Pittsburgh Pirates
Billy Joe Hobert, 16th round, 453rd overall by the Chicago White Sox, but did not sign
Marshall Faulk, 43rd round, 1195th overall by the California Angels, but did not sign
Daryl Porter, 56th round, 1493rd overall by the California Angels, but did not sign
Charlie Ward, 59th round, 1556th overall by the Milwaukee Brewers, but did not sign

External links
Complete draft list from The Baseball Cube database

References

Major League Baseball draft
Draft
Major League Baseball draft